The Gale of 1878, was an intense Category 2 hurricane that was active between October 18 and October 25. It caused extensive damage from Cuba to New England. Believed to be the strongest storm to hit the Washington - Baltimore region since hurricane records began in 1851, a complete record exists of this hurricane throughout its lifecycle from formation to dissipation.

Meteorological history 

A tropical storm formed off the coast of Jamaica on October 18, 1878, and moved nearly due north. On October 20, the storm reached hurricane status and on October 21, the hurricane struck Cuba. The damage in Cuba was only minor and three schooners sank. The hurricane continued moving northeast and made landfall in North Carolina where it wrecked a schooner and several steamers. The storm later continued inland moving at speeds between 40-50 mph, carrying hurricane-force winds as far as Richmond, Virginia, before merging with an extratropical storm over New England.

Impact 
The hurricane killed at least 71 people and left $2 million in damage (1878 USD).

Cuba 
Hurricane conditions were reported at Havana. Much damage was done to buildings, though three schooners sank over waters. Pressure reports were missing during the storm's passage over the isle, and the lowest pressure noted was 29.67" at 4:25 p.m.   Observations were sporadic during the cyclone's passage over the island.

Mid-Atlantic States 
There were sustained wind speeds over 100 mph recorded at Cape Lookout, North Carolina. Several ships and schooners sank during the storm, including the steamer City of Houston which was lost on Frying Pan Shoals.

In Virginia, the hurricane damaged several weather stations and 19 sailors drowned when their ship, the A.S.Davis, was driven ashore at Virginia Beach during the storm. There was heavy tree and building damage in Richmond.

Washington D.C. experienced heavy tree damage and isolated flooding.

Many houses were damaged in Maryland. Many of the telegraphs lines were blown down, and several sections of Baltimore were flooded.

The hurricane wrecked many ships and small boats in the Chesapeake Bay, while South Wilmington, Delaware, was flooded. In Middletown, damage was done to the Presbyterian church, Episcopal church, and the Delmarva Drying House.  The long bridge over the St. Augustine creek and surrounding marsh was destroyed.

Severe damage occurred across New Jersey, including many railroad lines being washed out, the toppling of the spire to the Fourth Presbyterian Church in Camden from strong winds, and the lifting of the Hereford Inlet Lighthouse from its foundations by the storm surge. At Port Elizabeth, breaches in the banks of the Maurice River made by the Gale of 76 were widened and made permanent creating large areas of marshland.

In Pennsylvania, at least 700 buildings were destroyed while nearly fifty churches lost their spires. There was nearly $2 million (1878 USD) in damage.

Minor damage was reported and several more ships sank in New England.

Eyewitness to the storm 
Mr. Bolton, an employee of the U.S. Signal Service, described the storm fury as he tried to fix one of the weather stations;
"....I was at the station when the gale, which proved so disastrous to human life commenced. A severe rain storm has prevailed all day Tuesday (22nd) but the gale did not reach the station until 9 p.m. It rapidly increased in velocity until it almost became a hurricane. The members of the crew at this station, whose duty it is to patrol the beach that night, performed their duties with the utmost difficulty, as they could scarcely make any headway against it, and often had to cling to some stationary object like a telephone pole to prevent themselves from being carried away at the mercy of the fearful tempest..."

The station employee also described when the A.S. Davis ran aground during the storm:
"....The debris was thickly scattered along the beach for a distance of fully 4 miles....I proceeded to Cape Henry, Virginia to assist the Signal Officer there. The body of one of the crew was there. About 1 ½ miles south of Cape Henry the bodies of eleven of the crew had been washed ashore.....During the heaviest part of the gale, the wind at Kitty Hawk, North Carolina registered 100 mph. The instrument itself was finally blown away and therefore no further record was made. It was the severest gale that had occurred on this coast for sometime."

See also 

 List of tropical cyclones
 List of Atlantic hurricanes
 List of New England hurricanes
 List of New Jersey hurricanes

References

External links 
 Gale of 1878 track (Unisys)

1870s Atlantic hurricane seasons
Category 2 Atlantic hurricanes
Hurricanes in Delaware
Hurricanes in New Jersey
Hurricanes in North Carolina
Gale
Gale
Gale